Rowland Hazard may refer to:

 Rowland Hazard (1763-1835), Rhode Island industrialist, established a woollen mill in Peace Dale, Rhode Island c.1804
 Rowland G. Hazard (1801–1888), son of above, industrialist associated with textile mill complexes in Peace Dale and Carolina, Rhode Island
 Rowland Hazard II (1829-1898), son of above, operated textile mills in Peace Dale and Carolina, Rhode Island; initial investor in Solvay Process Co.
 Rowland G. Hazard II (1855–1918), son of above, vice president of the Solvay Process Company
 Rowland Hazard III (1881–1945), son of above, American businessman and politician, connected with the founding of Alcoholics Anonymous

See also 
 Hazard family
 Hazard (disambiguation)